Johann Erich Biester (17 November 1749, in Lübeck – 20 February 1816, in Berlin) was a German philosopher. With Friedrich Nicolai and Friedrich Gedike, he formed what was known as the 'Triumvirate' of late Enlightenment Berlin.

Life
From 1767 to 1771 he studied law and English literature in Göttingen and was taken on as a jurist in Lübeck.

References

Bibliography 
 Alken Bruns: Johann Erich Biester in: Biographisches Lexikon für Schleswig-Holstein und Lübeck, Band 12 Neumünster 2006, p. 34 ff. 
 Karl H. Salzmann: Biester, Johann Erich. In Neue Deutsche Biographie (NDB). Vol. 2, Duncker & Humblot, Berlin 1955, p. 234
 Alfred Hass (1880 - ?): Johann Erich Biester. Sein Leben und sein Wirken. Ein Beitrag zur Geschichte der Aufklärungszeit in Preussen. Inaugural-Dissertation zur Erlangung der Doktorwürde der Philosophischen Fakultät der Universität Frankfurt a. M., 1925.
 Alfred Hass: in Die Deutsche Schule. Monatsschrift. Im Auftrage des Deutschen Lehrervereins, 30. Jahrgang. 1926, Johann Erich Biesters Bedeutung für das Geistes - und Bildungsleben Preußens während der Aufklärungszeit. Seiten 602 - 611, 667 - 676, 730 - 740.
 Ernst Kelchner: Biester, Johann Erich. In: Allgemeine Deutsche Biographie (ADB). Band 2, Duncker & Humblot, Leipzig 1875, S. 632 f.
 Bernd Horlemann (ed.), Hans-Jürgen Mende (ed.): Berlin 1994. Taschenkalender, Edition Luisenstadt Berlin, Nr. 01280; Seiten zwischen 16. und 17. Januar: Nicolais genauester Freund

External links 

 Books on and by Biester in the Deutschen Nationalbibliothek
 H. W. L. Biester: Über die Beziehungen zwischen Friedrich Nicolai und Johann Erich Biester. In Forum Nicolai, 2007 (also at PDF-Version)

German philosophers
1749 births
1816 deaths
Writers from Lübeck